Fuyu may refer to:
 Fuyu Kyrgyz language, the easternmost Turkic language
 Koguryoic languages, also called the Buyeo languages, a group of Koreanic languages spoken in Korea and Manchuria mentioned in ancient Chinese sources
 Buyeo, an ancient kingdom in Manchuria, also rendered as Fuyu based on Hanyu Pinyin romanization

China
Fuyu, Jilin (扶余), city in Jilin
Fuyu County, Heilongjiang (富裕县)
Fuyu Town (富裕镇), seat of Fuyu County
Xueting Fuyu (雪庭福裕), a Shaolin Temple abbot of the 13th century
 Mount Fuyu, a former name of Bozhong Mountain in Shaanxi, the source of the Han River
Fuyu–Nenjiang railway single-track railroad in northeastern China
People
Li Fuyu (李富玉), Chinese road bicycle racer
Yang Fuyu Chinese biochemist, biophysicist, and writer
Wang Fuyu (王富玉), Chinese politician

Japan
Fuyu persimmon, a type of Japanese persimmon or Diospyros kaki
Iha Fuyu (伊波普猷), a Japanese scholar who had a profound impact on the study of Okinawa
Fuyu Yoshida (吉田 冬優), Japanese swimmer

Taiwan
Fuyu Oriental Crown (富宇東方之冠), a residential skyscraper in Taichung

Japanese masculine given names